Umerkot (Sindhi: عمرڪوٽ; IPA: [ʊmərkoːʈ], formerly known as Amarkot) is a city in the Sindh province of Pakistan.

The local language is Dhatki,  one of the Rajasthani languages of the Indo-Aryan language family. It is most closely related to Marwari. Sindhi, Urdu and Punjabi are also understood by the citizens.

Etymology 

The city is named after a local ruler of Sindh, Umer Soomro Rajput of the Umar Marvi story, which also appears in Shah Jo Risalo  one of the popular tragic romances of Sindh. However, the myth of Umer Marvi is believed to have been made up to islamise the history of Amarkot, which was named after its original founder, Amar Singh.

History
Amarkot province was ruled by the Sodha Rajput clan  during the medieval period. Rana Parshad, the Sodha Rajput ruler of Umarkot, gave refuge to Humayun, the second Mughal Emperor when he was ousted by Sher Shah Suri, and the following Mughal Emperor, Akbar, was born here. Later on, Akbar brought northwestern India, including modern Pakistan, under Mughal rule.

After the disintegration of the Mughal Empire, Amarkot was captured by several regional powers, including the Persians, Afghans, Kalhora and Talpur Balochis of Sindh, Rathore Rajputs of Jodhpur and finally by the British.

Amarkot was annexed by Jodhpur State in 1779 from the Kalhora nawab of Sindh Umerkot and its fort was traded to the British in 1843 by the Maharaja of Jodhpur in return for a Rs.10,000 reduction in the tribute imposed on Jodhpur State. The British appointed Syed Mohammad Ali governor of the province. In 1847, Rana Ratan Singh was hanged at the fort by the British, for killing Syed Mohammad Ali in a tax protest.

After the British conquered Sindh, they made it part of the Bombay Presidency of British India. In 1858, the entire area around Tharparkar became part of the Hyderabad Division. In 1860 the region was renamed Eastern Sindh Frontier, with a  headquarters at Amarkot. In 1882, it was reorganized as the Thar and Parkar district, headed by a British Deputy Commissioner, with a political superintendent at Amarkot. However, in 1906 the district headquarters moved from Amarkot to Mirpur Khas.

Rana Chandra Singh, a federal minister and the chieftain of the Hindu Sodha Thakur Rajput clan and the Amarkot Jagir, was one of the founding members of the Pakistan Peoples Party (PPP) and was elected to the National Assembly of Pakistan from Umarkot seven times as a PPP member between 1977 and 1999, when he founded the Pakistan Hindu Party (PHP). Currently, his politician son Rana Hamir Singh claims to be the 26th Rana of Tharparkar, Umarkot and Mithi.

Points of interest 
The city is well connected with the other large cities like Karachi, the provincial capital and Hyderabad.

Umarkot has many sites of historical significance such as Akbar's birthplace, Umarkot, Umerkot Fort and Momal Ji Mari.

There is an ancient temple, Shiv Mandir, Umerkot, as well as a Kali Mata Temple, Krishna Mandir at old Amarkot and Manhar Mandir Kathwari Mandir at Rancho Line.

Folklore
The story of Umar Marvi is that Marvi was a young Thari girl from a village near Umerkot called Bhalwa. She was abducted by then-ruler, Umar, who wanted to marry her because of her beauty. Upon her refusal, she was imprisoned in the historic Umerkot Fort for several years. Because of her courage, Marvi is regarded as a symbol of love for one's soil and homeland.

Education 
The city has more than 100 schools, 20 colleges, and one polytechnic college.

Religion

The Umarkot Shiv Mandir is one of the most ancient and sacred Hindu temples in Sindh.

See also 
 Islamkot
 Mithi
 District Government of Umerkot
 Akbar
 Tharparkar

Gallery

Notes

References

External links

 District government Umerkot official website (English version)

 
Hinduism in Sindh